My Turn to Eat is the debut studio album of American rapper Big Kuntry King, released on September 30, 2008 through Grand Hustle and Atlantic Records. The album features guest appearances  from T.I., Trey Songz, Lloyd, Young Dro, Ricco Barrino, Lil Duval and includes productions from J.U.S.T.I.C.E. League, Marvelous J and Shawty Redd and others. The genre is Hiphop/Rap.

The album debuted at #98 on the Billboard 200 with 6,000 copies sold in the first week of its release.

Singles 
"That's Right", released on May 15, 2007, was produced by Grand Hustle production duo Nard & B and features T.I. on the hook. The music video for "That's Right" was released on November 13, 2007. It was shot in front of T.I.'s nightclub, Club Crucial, in Atlanta, Georgia. Comedian Lil Duval along with several Grand Hustle recording artists such as Young Dro, Alfamega and Xtaci make cameo appearances.

"Da Baddest", released on October 23, 2007, was produced by Shawty Redd and features Trey Songz singing the hook. The video for "Da Baddest" was released on July 29, 2008. It was shot in Atlanta, with cameo appearances from T.I., DJ Drama, Maino, B.o.B, and Fantasia.

Neither single charted.

Track listing

Charts

References 

2008 debut albums
Albums produced by DJ Toomp
Albums produced by Kane Beatz
Albums produced by Shawty Redd
Atlantic Records albums
Big Kuntry King albums
Grand Hustle Records albums
Albums produced by J.U.S.T.I.C.E. League
Trap music albums
Albums produced by Nard & B